Chrotogonus hemipterus is a species of grasshopper in the family Pyrgomorphidae. It is a pest of millets in India.

References

Pyrgomorphidae
Insect pests of millets